Liam Brian Williams (born 9 April 1991) is a Welsh professional rugby union player who primarily plays fullback for Cardiff in the United Rugby Championship. He has also represented Wales at international level, having made his test debut against New Zealand during the 2012 Autumn Internationals. Williams has previously played for clubs such as Scarlets and Saracens in the past.

Club career
A school boy developed by the local Waunarlwydd RFC club, he was not picked up by any of the Welsh regional professional academies, and hence aged 16 started working as a trainee scaffolder at Port Talbot Steelworks, whilst continuing to play for Waunarlwydd.

Aged 20 Williams was signed by Scarlets, being developed for his first year in 2010–11 at Llanelli RFC, making his debut against Carmarthen Quins in March 2010. Williams then went on to make his Scarlets regional debut against Connacht on 10 September 2011 and scoring his first try in the away defeat to Benetton Rugby on 1 October 2011. Williams had a dream first season at the Scarlets, going on to score 40 points in 26 appearances. His performances led him to be nominated for the LV Breakthrough Player Award and he was voted Player's Player of the Year for the Scarlets.

Following a string of superb performances for both Scarlets and Wales during 2014, Williams was named Wales Player of the Year.

Williams played an integral role in the Scarlets run to the 2017 Pro12 Grand Final, their first championship win since 2004. This included crossing for the opening try in the final against Munster, with Scarlets eventually running out 22-46 winners at the Aviva Stadium.

In 2017, it was announced Williams would be joining Aviva Premiership side Saracens in England on a three-year contract from the 2017–18 season. In the 2018–19 season Williams helped Saracens to both the Premiership title and the European Rugby Champions Cup. In the Premiership final against Exeter Williams scored a try. Following exposure of Saracens salary-cap breach, Williams secured an early release from his contract. Williams left Saracens with a record of 21 tries in 31 Saracens appearances and a 90.5% win rate in the Aviva Premiership having won 19 of 21 games played.

Williams returned to Scarlets with immediate effect on 25 February 2020. Following an injury hit period with Scarlets it was announced on 6 January 2022 that Williams would join Cardiff Rugby ahead of the 2022-23 season.

International

Wales
Capped by Wales at U20 level in 2011 in both the Six Nations and Word Rugby Junior Championships, Williams was named in the senior Wales training squad for the first time for the match versus Australia on 3 December 2011. He went on to make his debut for Wales against the Barbarians on 2 June 2012 at the Millennium Stadium.

Williams made his Six Nations debut against Ireland in Round 2 of the 2014 Six Nations Championship, going on to play in each subsequent match of that tournament. He scored his first international try and was named Man of the Match in the final game, a 51–3 win against Scotland.

Williams was called up to the Wales squad for the 2015 Rugby World Cup despite being a doubt following surgery on his foot in June 2015. Williams started at Fullback for the first two pool games however both games ended prematurely. Against Uruguay, Williams was withdrawn due to a first half dead leg before returning for the England game. Against England, Williams received a kick to the head following a punt attempt by Tom Wood. Wood managed to avoid a ban for the kick, with citing commissioner Maurizio Vancini preferring to give a warning. Williams would again return for the final pool game against Australia, beginning the defeat on the wing. This game would see Williams suffer a new foot injury and would prematurely end his participation in the tournament.

On 17 November 2018, Williams won his 50th Wales cap in an Autumn International against Tonga, scoring two tries as Wales ran out 74-24 winners.

Williams secured his first Grand Slam with Wales during the 2019 Six Nations Championship. Williams started every game at 15 and contributed a Man of the Match performance in the 21–13 win over England on 23 February 2019. This win also sealed Wales 12th consecutive test win beating the previous record of 11, set between 1907 and 1910.

In September 2019, Williams was selected as part of the Wales squad for 2019 Rugby World Cup. Williams entered the tournament as first choice Fullback and started at 15 in each game he played as Wales reached the semi-finals. Williams scored his first Rugby World Cup try on 23 September 2019 in the opening game against Georgia. After impressing in the 25–29 win against Australia, Williams would score again in the following game against Fiji, helping Wales to secure their qualification for the quarter-finals. After overcoming France and booking their place in the semi-finals, Williams suffered an ankle injury ahead of the game, ruling him out of the rest of the tournament.

British & Irish Lions
In April 2017, Williams received an invitation to play in the 2017 British & Irish Lions tour to New Zealand. Williams played in the provincial games against the Blues, Crusaders and Chiefs, both at Fullback and Wing. Williams began the first test at 15, contributing to a 'wonder try' that was the stand out score of the series. This involved collecting the ball under pressure in his own 22 before side stepping All Blacks captain Kieran Read and driving past others up to halfway before offloading to Jonathan Davies. After exchanges with Elliot Daly, Sean O'Brien then finished the move. In the second test Williams again contributed to the first Lions try, with his quality distribution providing an assist to Taulupe Faletau as the Lions ran out 21-24 winners. Williams then played a central role in the final test, securing a series draw. Williams ended the tour having made 344 metres during the 414 minutes on the field with an impressive 12 defenders beaten and 47 carries made.

Williams was selected for his second British and Irish Lions tour in May 2021 against the reigning World Champions South Africa. Williams appeared as a replacement in the first test victory but would drop out of the match day 23 for the second test. Williams would then start the final test on 7 August 2021, taking his total Lions appearances to 5.

International tries

Personal life
Williams is known by the nickname Sanjay, which he has had since he was young. He currently lives with his Welsh model wife Sophie Harries having been together since 2015. They were married in a stunning ceremony on 30 July 2022. Williams has spoken previously about his struggles with a stammer which was exacerbated by the pressures of conducting press interviews. Williams has sought therapy to resolve this and has conducted more interviews since. Williams is known for his unusual running style stemming from bowing of his legs. This does not impact his performances and has not been corrected following advice from doctors that doing so could end his career.

References

External links

 Scarlets profile

1991 births
British & Irish Lions rugby union players from Wales
Living people
Rugby union players from Swansea
Saracens F.C. players
Scarlets players
Wales international rugby union players
Welsh rugby union players
Rugby union wings
Rugby union fullbacks
Cardiff Rugby players